Logan United Football Club were a professional Australian soccer club based in Logan, Queensland which played in the Queensland State League. They did not apply to stay in the league for the 2010 Queensland State League season.

History
Logan United was formed in 2008 to join the Queensland State League, a new league formed to fill the gap between the A-League and various city competitions around the state. In their first season in the competition the team placed fifth (out of ten teams), then sixth (out of eleven) in the 2009 season. The club started with a strong squad, including some former A-League players, such as Switzerland-born Remo Buess who had played with FC Zurich in the Swiss Super League as well as Queensland Roar (now Brisbane Roar) in the A-League, Papua New Guinean international Reggie Davani, Fijian national team player Raj Oshen and Vanuatu national football team Goalkeeper Chikau Mansale. Former English Premier League Goalkeeper Jason Kearton works as the club's Goalkeeping coach.

Colours and badge
The club's home kit was black and white strip jerseys, with white pants and white socks. The club's away jersey is yellow, with black pants and yellow socks. Crestmead based company 'BWS' wereLogan United's major sponsor, with their logo on the club's strip on both the front and back of their squad jerseys.

Previous squad
2009 Queensland State League Squad

Representatives
The following players are currently or were formerly members of their respective national teams:

  Daniel Gecic
  Reggie Davani
  Chikau Mansale
  Raj Oshen

The following players are currently or were formerly members of their respective national youth teams:

  Remo Buess
  Daniel Gecic
  Blake Kallis
  Damien Kallis
  Sebastian Usai

Club Partnerships
In 2009, Logan United signed several partnerships with local clubs in the area to strengthen their own team as well as provide opportunities to share coaching information as well as players with developmental clubs. These clubs included Greenbank Seniors FC, Logan Uniting Church SC and Eagle United FC

Club achievements

All-Time Most Appearances
  Sebastian Usai – 41 Games

All-Time Leading Goalscorer
  Daniel Gecic – 38 Goals

Most Yellow Cards In A Season
  Josh Filewood – 7 Yellow Cards

Most Red Cards In A Season
  Josh Filewood – 2 Red Cards

All-Time Most Assists
  Daniel Gecic – 22 Assists

First Player to score a goal
 Robert Laslo Vs North Queensland Razorbacks, Round 1–30 March 2008

First player to score over 1 goal in a game
 Blake Kallis – 2 goals vs Redlands City Devils, Round 4–19 April 2008

Youngest Player to Play For Logan United FC
 Damien Kallis – 16 years 196 days Vs QAS – 2 August 2008

See also
 Queensland State League

References

Queensland State League soccer teams
2008 establishments in Australia
2010 disestablishments in Australia